Kolad is a village in Raigad district, Maharashtra State, India. It is 117 km from Mumbai on the National Highway no 66(Mumbai-Goa) its also connected Pune via kolad Pune-  kolad state highaway . It lies on the banks of River Kundalika. The village post office Postal Index Number (PIN code) is 402304 & 402109.

Weather 
Kolad has a varied climate; spring (March to May) is hot and sultry, while the monsoon season (June to September) is accompanied by heavy rainfalls. Winters are during November and February and are characterized by a medium level of humidity and cool weather.

Demographics 
At the 2001 India census, Kolad had a population of 12,116.

Geography
Nearby villages include dagadwadi, Gove, Pugaon, Pui, Pahur, Suttarwadi, Kudali, Ambewadi, Kamat, Jamgaon, Durtoli, Bhira, Ville, Tise, Bhuvan, Talavali and Yeral.

Nearby towns are Roha, Indapur, Mangaon and Nagothane.

Transport 

Kolad is located on NH 17, popularly known as the Mumbai - Goa highway. Kolad can also be accessed from the Mumbai Pune Expressway, via the Khopoli exit, and State Highway 60. The Maharashtra State Road Transport Corporation (MSRTC) operates regular bus services to Roha. Mangaon. Auto rickshaws also ply the route.

Kolad Railway Station 
Kolad railway station is the first station on the Konkan Railway line. Express and mail trains connect Kolad to Mumbai in approximately three hours. Kolad is the starting point for the roll-on/roll-off (RORO) service of the Konkan Railway, a road-rail synergy system, where loaded trucks are directly carried by railway wagons and delivered to their destination by rail. This service was introduced in January 1999.

Infrastructure 
Most of the infrastructure in Kolad are maintained by Gram Panchayat, which include paving the roads, provision of water supply and other essential services like garbage disposal and beautification.

Electricity is provided by the state-run Maharashtra State Electricity Board (MSEB). Telecom services are managed by the state-run BSNL telecom and other private companies. Broadband is provided by BSNL. BSNL & TATA are the only service providers with a complete network.

River rafting at Kolad 
White water river rafting is a popular adventure water sport for people from in Mumbai and Pune. The Kundalika River in Kolad is the best option for white water rafting in Maharashtra. The huge amount of water released from a local dam each morning creates good opportunities for rafting. The Maharashtra government promotes river rafting through its official tourism website.

References

Villages in Raigad district